Banjo, of the Overflow is a poem by Australian poet Francis Kenna. It was first published in The Bulletin magazine on 27 August 1892 in reply to fellow poets Henry Lawson, Banjo Paterson and Edward Dyson.  This poem formed part of the Bulletin Debate, a series of works by Lawson, Paterson, and others, about the true nature of life in the Australian bush.

In Up The Country, Lawson had criticised "City Bushmen" such as Banjo Paterson who tended to romanticise bush life. Paterson, in turn, accused Lawson of representing bush life as nothing but doom and gloom. Kenna's poem is a parody of Paterson's popular work, Clancy of the Overflow, playfully pointing out the irony of a city-dweller writing poems about life in the country. The author of the poem was initially credited only as "K."

See also
 1892 in poetry
 1892 in literature
 Australian literature

References 

1892 poems
Australian poems
Bulletin Debate
Works originally published in The Bulletin (Australian periodical)